Shahrak-e Qaem (also Romanized as Shahrak-e Qā’em; also known as Khaṭāb) is a village in Garmkhan Rural District, Garmkhan District, Bojnord County, North Khorasan Province, Iran. At the 2006 census, its population was 327, in 76 families.

References 

Populated places in Bojnord County